Arnold Allan Cecil Keppel, 8th Earl of Albemarle,  (1 June 1858 – 12 April 1942), styled Viscount Bury from 1891 to 1894, was a British soldier, courtier and Conservative politician.

Life and political career
Lord Albemarle was the eldest son of William Keppel, 7th Earl of Albemarle, and his wife Sophia Mary, daughter of Sir Allan Napier McNab, 1st Baronet, a Canadian politician, and was educated at Eton College. In 1892 he was returned to Parliament for Birkenhead, a seat he held until 1894 when he succeeded his father in the earldom and took his seat in the House of Lords. Lord Albemarle served in the Conservative administrations of Bonar Law and Stanley Baldwin as a Lord-in-waiting (government whip in the House of Lords) between 1922 and 1924.

He was elected a Fellow of the Zoological Society of London (FZS) in July 1902.

Military career
He was commissioned as a Sub-lieutenant in the part-time Dorset Militia in 1877 and the following year transferred to the Scots Guards as a Second lieutenant. He resigned his commission in 1883. In 1892 he took over his father's position as Lieutenant-Colonel of the 12th Middlesex (Civil Service) Rifle Volunteer Corps, retaining the command until 1901.

After the outbreak of the Second Boer War in October 1899, a corps of imperial volunteers from London was formed in late December 1899. The corps included infantry, mounted infantry, and artillery divisions and was authorized with the name City of London Imperial Volunteers (CIV). It proceeded to South Africa in January 1900, returned in October of the same year, and was disbanded in December 1900. Lord Albemarle was appointed in charge of the infantry division of the CIV on 3 January 1900, with the temporary rank of lieutenant-colonel in the Army, and served as such until the corps was disbanded. He was mentioned in despatches, received the Queen's South Africa Medal with four clasps, and was in 1900 appointed a Companion of the Order of the Bath (CB) for his services in South Africa. He received the honorary rank of Lt-Col in the Army.

Albemarle was appointed Honorary Colonel of the 4th (2nd Norfolk Militia) Battalion of the Norfolk Regiment in 1900 and of the 2nd Volunteer Battalion of the regiment (later 5th Bn Norfolks in the Territorial Force) in 1906. He commanded the Norfolk Volunteer Infantry Brigade with the rank of Brigadier-General from 1901 to 1906. He was awarded both the Volunteer Decoration (VD) and the Territorial Decoration (TD)

He was an Aide-de-Camp to both Edward VII and George V, and was appointed a Member of the Royal Victorian Order (MVO) in July 1901, advanced to a Knight Commander (KCVO) of the same Order in 1909, and promoted to the Grand Cross (GCVO) of the order in 1931.

He is credited with sculpting the statue of the two drummer boys from Rudyard Kipling's story The Drums of the Fore and Aft that now stands in Woodbridge, Suffolk.

Family
Lord Albemarle married Lady Gertrude Lucia Egerton (1861–1943), daughter of Wilbraham Egerton, 1st Earl Egerton, in 1881. They had four sons and one daughter:
 Walter Egerton George Lucian (1882–1979); married firstly in 1909 Lady Judith Sydney Myee Wynn-Carington (1889–1928), daughter of the 1st and last Marquess of Lincolnshire; they had five children. He married secondly in 1931 Diana Cicely Grove (1909–2013); they had one daughter.
 Arnold Joost William (1884–1964); married firstly, in 1921, Doris Lilian Carter, they divorced in 1938. He married secondly, in 1938, Annie Margaret Blanche Purnell. He married thirdly, in 1952, Mildred Rodber. He had no children from any of his marriages.
 Rupert Oswald Derek (1886–1964); married in 1919 (annulled in 1921) Violet Mary de Trafford, without issue.
 Elizabeth Mary Gertrude (1890–1986); married Sir Torquhil Matheson, 5th Baronet, and they had two sons.
 Albert Edward George Arnold (1898–1917); killed in action in the Battle of Passchendaele near Ypres, Belgium. He died unmarried.

Albemarle died in Quidenham, Norfolk, on 12 April 1942, aged 83, and was succeeded in the earldom by his eldest son, Walter.

Notes

References
 Burke's Peerage, Baronetage and Knightage, 100th Edn, London, 1953.
 Kidd, Charles, Williamson, David (editors). Debrett's Peerage and Baronetage (1990 edition). New York: St Martin's Press, 1990.

www.thepeerage.com

External links 
 

1858 births
1942 deaths
British Army personnel of the Second Boer War
British Militia officers
Companions of the Order of the Bath
Albemarle, Arnold Keppel, Earl of
Arnold 8
Arnold Keppel, 8th Earl of Albemarle
Knights Grand Cross of the Royal Victorian Order
Scots Guards officers
Albemarle, Arnold Keppel, Earl of
Albemarle, E8
City Imperial Volunteers officers
Grand Crosses of the Order of the White Lion
Knights Grand Cross of the Order of Orange-Nassau
People educated at Eton College